Youz bir is a very popular dance and is performed inclined to musical composition. Its speed is a little fast and it is performed of different movements. Both men and women can perform it. It was very celebrated at past but at present it is performed rarely.

Notes

Azerbaijani dances